Steve Oatley (born June 17, 1984) is a journalist, political and social commentator known for the podcast "Wake Up America".

Early life and career 
Oatley was born in Hyannis, Massachusetts, and attended the University of Vermont studying microbiology and American Public University studying business. He has worked in the trucking and logistics industry since 2010. In 2018 he began a podcast called Freight Broker Live, covering the freight and logistics industry, In December 2019 he moved his show over to Freightwaves and joined their ranks as a broadcaster and "freightcaster" In April 2020 he left and rebranded Freight Broker Live to PT News Network and launched the podcast Wake Up America. He also installed a billboard over the Portland Police Bureau headquarters which antifa burned down.

References 

Living people
Journalists from Massachusetts
1984 births